Sucat Thermal Power Plant was an oil-fired steam turbine plant in Muntinlupa commissioned in 1968. The plant was fully decommissioned in 2002. The land occupied by the facility is planned to be auctioned by the government to private bidders in late 2015 or early 2016 on conditions that the property will be kept as a power-generation site. Rehabilitation of the facility was previously considered but such plans were dropped after it was deemed too costly to recommission the plant compared to constructing a new one in its place and the facility is already flooded.

History
Known formerly as the Gardner Snyder Thermal Plant, the Sucat Thermal Power Plant was commissioned on August 1, 1968, upon the completion of Unit 1 of the facility. Additional units were built on January 15, 1970, July 1, 1971, and July 31, 1972. In November 1978, the National Power Corporation acquired the facility from Meralco.

In January 2000, Unit 1 and 4 was decommissioned but was preserved. Unit 2 and 3 were later decommissioned at a later time in January 2002. The Sucat Thermal Power Plant was decommissioned due to its emissions exceeding the limits set by the Clean Air Act.

The plant is being demolished since 2017, and only the two chimneys (popularly nicknamed "Stick-O" after the brand of barquillo-derived snack) and the exterior trusses remain as of 2019.

By mid-2019, scaffolding has been set up around the plant for further demolition. Both of the chimneys are no longer visible.

Redevelopment
On documents regarding the PNR South Long Haul project, it is stated that the area will be rebuilt into the new Sucat station. The line will serve both the North–South Commuter Railway and the new Bicol Express service.

References

Oil-fired power stations in the Philippines
Buildings and structures in Muntinlupa
Former oil-fired power stations
Energy infrastructure completed in 1968
Former buildings and structures in Metro Manila
Former power stations in the Philippines
20th-century architecture in the Philippines